WPXD-TV (channel 31) is a television station licensed to Ann Arbor, Michigan, United States, serving as the Ion Television affiliate for the Detroit area. Owned by Inyo Broadcast Holdings, the station maintains studios and transmitter facilites on West 11 Mile Road in Southfield, Michigan.

History
In 1973, Ann Arbor resident Gershom Morningstar acquired a construction permit from the Federal Communications Commission (FCC) to operate a local station on UHF channel 31, but lack of funds meant that Morningstar was unable to build the station. In January 1980, Morningstar sold the license to Satellite Syndicated Systems (SSS) of Oklahoma. SSS gave the station the call letters WRHT, with studios in Chelsea, Michigan.

WRHT signed on the air on January 13, 1981, originally operating as an independent station. The first program broadcast on the station was a college basketball game between the Texas Tech Red Raiders and the Baylor Bears from the TVS Television Network, a nationally syndicated sports network. This was done largely to test the satellite equipment, which would be utilized further after the switch to In-Home Theater (see below). Most of channel 31's early programming, was either locally produced or outsourced by other production companies; it also carried business news programming from the Financial News Network (which later merged with CNBC in 1989), as well as some programs from the Satellite Program Network.

It was located further west than the other Detroit stations in order to remain within  of its city of license, Ann Arbor (as required by FCC rules). The channel 31 analog signal could be received as far away as St. Johns, Flint, and Owosso, with its fringe range reaching close to Battle Creek, Coldwater and Toledo.

The station's call letters were changed to WIHT on February 1, 1981, in reference to its affiliation with the over-the-air subscription television service In-Home Theater (also known as "IT"). WXON (channel 20, now WMYD) offered a similar service, ONTV, at that time – but unlike that service, which was generally broadcast during the evening hours on channel 20, WIHT ran In-Home Theater programming at least 14 hours a day, and had a wider selection of movies. However, while IT was available in Lansing, Jackson and Flint, it was not available in the eastern Detroit suburbs or Windsor, Ontario, due to the transmitter's location and signal power.

Non-subscribers that tuned into WIHT during In-Home Theater's airtime instead heard an audio feed of Onondaga-based NOAA Weather Radio station WXK 81. While ON-TV faded away in 1983 as cable television became more prevalent in the Detroit area, IT lasted more than two additional years and did not fold until November 1, 1985.

In 1989, the station was purchased by Blackstar Television; it then changed its call letters to WBSX on July 14 of that year. Locally produced and syndicated programming was phased out in favor of programming from the Home Shopping Network. On February 4, 1998, Paxson Communications (the forerunner of Ion Media, whose founder Lowell "Bud" Paxson founded the Home Shopping Network) purchased WBSX. Paxson already owned WJUE (channel 43) in Battle Creek. However, WJUE's transmitter was located in western Eaton County, within the Lansing/Jackson market. The FCC told Paxson that it could not keep both WBSX and WJUE, as both stations provided city-grade coverage of Lansing and Jackson. At the time, the FCC normally did not allow common ownership of two stations with overlapping signals, and would not even consider granting a waiver for a city-grade overlap. Paxson opted to keep WBSX and sell WJUE to sister company DP Media, who changed the calls to WILV. However, Paxson continued to operate channel 43 under a local marketing agreement, effectively making it a sister station to WBSX.

Channel 31 subsequently changed its call letters to the current WPXD-TV, after Paxson changed the callsigns of most of its stations to include "PX" in them. WILV also changed its calls at this time, to WZPX-TV. Both stations joined Paxson's new family-oriented broadcast network Pax TV (renamed i: Independent Television on July 1, 2005, and to the current Ion Television on January 29, 2007) when it launched on August 31, 1998. The station moved its offices from its original facility in Ann Arbor, to a building in downtown Detroit, before later moving back to Ann Arbor. Despite the analog signal reaching close to those two cities, Comcast systems in Lansing and Jackson received Pax/i/Ion programming from WZPX, which Paxson bought outright in 2000.

Sale to Scripps and resale to Inyo
On September 24, 2020, the Cincinnati-based E. W. Scripps Company (owner of WXYZ-TV and WMYD) announced that it would purchase Ion Media for $2.65 billion, with financing from Berkshire Hathaway. With this purchase, Scripps will divest 23 Ion-owned stations, but no announcement has been made as to which stations that Scripps will divest as part of the move (WPXD-TV is likely to be one of the divested outlets since Scripps already owns two stations in the Detroit market). The proposed divestitures will allow the merged company to fully comply with the FCC local and national ownership regulations. Scripps has agreed to a transaction with an unnamed buyer, who has agreed to maintain Ion affiliations for the stations.

Technical information

Subchannels
The station's digital signal is multiplexed:

Analog-to-digital conversion
During October 2008, the Federal Communications Commission accepted WPXD-TV's petition to move its digital signal to channel 19 on February 17, 2009, broadcasting at 1,000 kW from the Southfield transmitter tower used by WKBD-TV (channel 50), vastly increasing its signal coverage in Metro Detroit and Windsor. However, on March 20, 2009, the FCC and the Canadian Radio-television and Telecommunications Commission (CRTC) denied the application to move the channel 19 allocation from Ann Arbor to Detroit and to move its transmitter to Southfield, in order to protect CKXT-DT-2 in London, Ontario, which also broadcast on channel 19 (the potential co-channel interference issued would later be rendered moot as CKXT permanently shut down on November 1, 2011). Due to the Canadian government rejecting the channel relocation, WPXD remained on UHF channel 31.

WPXD-TV shut down its analog signal, over UHF channel 31, on February 17, 2009, the original target date for full-power television stations in the United States to transition from analog to digital broadcasts under federal mandate (which Congress had moved the previous month to June 12). The station's digital signal moved from its pre-transition UHF channel 33 to UHF channel 50 (which was previously occupied by the analog signal of WKBD-TV) for post-transition operations on July 24, 2012. Through the use of PSIP, digital television receivers display the station's virtual channel as its former UHF analog channel 31. As a result, WPXD and WMYD were the only commercial television stations in the Detroit market to terminate their analog signals before June 12, the date which Congress chose to reschedule the completion of the digital transition.

The original channel 33 digital transmitter operated at a relatively low wattage (110 kW), and originated from the same tower as WPXD's analog signal in Lyndon Township; this resulted in interference with low-power Class A station W33BY, which also broadcast on UHF channel 33. On or about May 11, 2009, a new application to modify a digital allotment was filed by the FCC, to allow WPXD to broadcast its digital signal on channel 50 from the Southfield tower at a radiated power of 345 kW, which was approved by the FCC and the CRTC. On October 21, 2009, the FCC granted a construction permit for WPXD's new digital facilities in Southfield; the station estimated that the stronger signal would reach an additional 1.8 million viewers.

On January 31, 2012, the station began testing its new transmitter in Southfield, keeping its UHF 31 transmitter in Chelsea operational as a temporary fill-in transmitter. The channel 50 transmitter abruptly ended transmissions less than two days later, leaving only its channel 31 digital signal and its analog translator W48AV. On May 23, 2012, the station again turned on its transmitter on UHF channel 50, but ceased transmission the following day. On July 24, 2012, WPXD began permanent digital transmitter operations in Southfield, broadcasting on UHF channel 50. The transmitter in Chelsea remained active until noon on August 20, 2012, though starting on the morning of August 6, 2012, the Chelsea transmitter replaced normal programming with SMPTE color bars and a scrolling message regarding this "technical change", noting for viewers to re-scan their converter boxes and sets and aim their antennas towards Southfield. The former Lyndon Township site was later repurposed as a transmitter site for former MyNetworkTV affiliate WHTV in Lansing, which ceased operations on August 31, 2017.

Former translator
WPXD's programming was previously repeated on low-power translator station W48AV (channel 48) in St. Clair Shores. The translator was originally designed to bring channel 31's programming to the immediate Detroit area, in areas where the main channel 31 signal had poor, or even no, reception. However, W48AV would experience some co-channel interference from WMNT-CA in Toledo, Ohio, which also broadcasts on UHF channel 48.

On December 29, 2008, Paxson Communications/Ion Media had requested their construction permit to flash-cut to digital on UHF 48 be cancelled (and was approved as submitted) by the FCC. This would later be replaced with an application for displacement to UHF 25 (and to convert to digital operations there).  This application was granted on July 11, 2012.

On December 15, 2014, Ion reached a deal to donate W48AV to Word of God Fellowship, parent company of the Daystar network. W48AV currently has an application to flash-cut to digital. Ion chose to part with W48AV, as it was made redundant following the relocation of WPXD's transmitter from Lyndon Township to Southfield. As part of the transaction, Daystar requested a special temporary authority for it to relocate to UHF 23 (the channel of its currently-operating station, WUDT-LD) to operate W48AV-D as a Daystar station; this was granted. W48AV was the last remaining American television station in the greater Detroit area to convert to digital. On November 18, 2015, W48AV's license was cancelled with the station being merged back into WUDT-LD, with only the PSIP of "W48AV 48.1" remaining as any trace of the station's existence for a brief period, before it reverted to using WUDT-LD's call-letters and PSIP (WUDT 23.1).

See also

 Media in Detroit

References

Ion Television affiliates
Court TV affiliates
Grit (TV network) affiliates
Defy TV affiliates
TrueReal affiliates
GetTV affiliates
Scripps News affiliates
Mass media in Ann Arbor, Michigan
Companies based in Southfield, Michigan
Television channels and stations established in 1981
1981 establishments in Michigan
PXD-TV